The following lists events that happened during 1901 in Australia.

Incumbents

 Monarch – Victoria (until 22 January), then Edward VII
 Governor-General – Lord Hopetoun (from 1 January)
 Prime Minister – Edmund Barton (from 1 January)
 Opposition Leader – George Reid (from 19 May)

State leaders
 Premier of New South Wales – William Lyne (until 27 March), then John See
 Opposition Leader – Charles Lee (from 23 March)
 Premier of Queensland – Robert Philp
 Opposition Leader – Anderson Dawson (until 16 July), then Billy Browne
 Premier of South Australia – Frederick Holder (until 15 May), then John Jenkins
 Opposition Leader – Vaiben Louis Solomon, then Robert Homburg
 Premier of Tasmania – Elliott Lewis
 Opposition Leader – Sir Edward Braddon (until March), then Sir Thomas Reibey (until October), then William Propsting
 Premier of Victoria – Sir George Turner (until 12 February), then Alexander Peacock
 Premier of Western Australia – Sir John Forrest (until 15 February), then George Throssell (until 27 May), then George Leake (until 21 November), then Alf Morgans (until 23 December), then George Leake

Governors and administrators
 Governor of New South Wales – The Earl Beauchamp (until 30 April)
 Governor of Queensland – Lord Lamington (until 19 December)
 Governor of South Australia – Lord Tennyson
 Governor of Tasmania – Sir Arthur Havelock (from 8 November)
 Governor of Victoria – Sir George Clarke (from 10 December)
 Governor of Western Australia – Baron Wetlock (from 1 May)
 Government Resident of the Northern Territory – Charles Dashwood

Events
 1 January – The Constitution of Australia comes into force, as the federation of Australia is complete. John Hope, 7th Earl of Hopetoun, is appointed as the first Governor-General, and Edmund Barton as the first Prime Minister.
 1 March – Following federation naval and military forces of the States are transferred to Commonwealth control.
 29 March – The first federal election is held to elect the first members of the House of Representatives and the first members of the Senate.
 31 March – A national census is held, which indicates the population of Australia is 3,773,801 (excluding Indigenous Australians).
 9 May – The Parliament of Australia is opened in the Royal Exhibition Building, Melbourne.
 22 May – The foundation stone for St John's Cathedral, Brisbane, is laid by The Duke of Cornwall and York (later George V). the church celebrated 100 years of construction in 2006 and is the only gothic-style stone building under construction anywhere in the world.
 3 September – The Flag of Australia and Australian Red Ensign are adopted by the Government of Australia as official flags, following a national design competition.
 21 December –  Construction begins on the rabbit-proof fence.
 23 December – The Immigration Restriction Act 1901 comes into force, instituting the White Australia Policy.
 31 December – The Roman Catholic Platform (now known as Cemetery Station No. 2) opens in Sydney, Australia's Rookwood Cemetery.

Sport
3 January – Victoria wins the Sheffield Shield.
28 September – Essendon beats Collingwood 6.7 (43) to 2.4 (16) in the 1901 VFL grand final
5 November – Revenue wins the Melbourne Cup.

Literature

Births
 27 March – Kenneth Slessor, poet, journalist and war correspondent (d. 1971)
 1 June – Tom Gorman, rugby league footballer (d. 1978)
 25 September – Gordon Coventry, Australian rules footballer (Collingwood) (d. 1968)

Deaths
 10 January – Sir James Dickson, 13th Premier of Queensland (born in the United Kingdom) (b. 1832)
 20 June – Alexander Forrest, Western Australian politician and explorer (b. 1849)
 8 August – William Henry Groom, Queensland politician and newspaper proprietor (born in the United Kingdom) (b. 1833)
 31 October – Robert Abbott, New South Wales politician (born in Ireland) (b. 1830)
 30 November – Edward John Eyre, explorer (born and died in the United Kingdom) (b. 1815)

See also
 1900 in Australia
 other events of 1901
 1902 in Australia
 Timeline of Australian history

References

 
Australia
Years of the 20th century in Australia